Advance Digital provides sales and content strategy, product development and technology to the Advance Local media group, part of Advance Publications. Advance Publications is an American media company owned by the descendants of Samuel Irving Newhouse, Sr.

Advance Local operates 12 local news and information websites affiliated to more than 30 newspapers. Its headquarters are at 1 World Trade Center in New York, New York. Advance Digital's headquarters are located at the Harborside Financial Center in Jersey City, New Jersey.

The unit's Advance Digital name was established December 16, 2011; its previous name was Advance Internet. Its president is Peter Weinberger. The president of Advance Local, established in 2010 and based in New York, is Randy Siegel.

Advance Local web sites provide local information such as breaking news, local sports, travel destinations, weather, dining, bar guides and health and fitness.

Web sites
al.com
cleveland.com
gulflive.com
lehighvalleylive.com
MardiGras.com
MassLive.com
MLive.com
NJ.com
OregonLive.com
PennLive.com
SILive.com
syracuse.com

References

External links
 

Online mass media companies of the United States
 Internet
Companies based in Jersey City, New Jersey
Mass media in Hudson County, New Jersey
1996 establishments in the United States